Zeddy Maruru (3 February 1942 – 11 January 2014) was a Ugandan military pilot and military officer. He served in all of Uganda's post independence armies, from 1964 until 2002. He was the commander of the Uganda Army Air Force during the 1970s. He also served as the Chief of Army Staff after Tito Okello overthrew Milton Obote's second administration in 1985.

Early life and education
Zeddy Maruru was born on 3 February 1942 in Rushenyi Village, in present-day Ntungamo District. He attended Rwamanyonyi Boys School and Kitunga Primary School. He then transferred to Mbarara High School, before completing his O-Level studies at Ntare School 1960. Maruru subsequently attended Royal Technical College, in Nairobi. He studied pre-engineering courses for two years. He then dropped out of the technical school, after attaining his A-Level Certificate. He returned to Uganda to help his father raise funds to educate his younger siblings.

Military service

Early career 
In 1964, Maruru joined the Uganda Army. He and about 30 others were sent to Jinja for basic military training for three months. He was then sent to Czechoslovakia for pilot training, spending there two and one half years. While there, he trained both as a pilot and as a pilot instructor.

From October 1970 until December 1971, he attended a Staff College course at the RAF Staff College, Bracknell, in the United Kingdom. While there, he was promoted to the rank of captain, by Idi Amin who visited the college in 1971.

Maruru returned to Uganda in 1967 and was commissioned as a second lieutenant. He was posted to Gulu Air Force Base, which was opened after his cohort returned from Czechoslovakia. At Gulu, he completed his training and recruited young men whom he and his classmates trained. In 1968, he was promoted to first lieutenant.

Air force commander and exile 
In 1973, at the rank of major, Maruru volunteered to accompany President Amin on a trip to Iraq. At the end of that trip, Maruru was promoted to lieutenant colonel. He also became quartermaster general of the air force. In 1974, he was made acting commander of the Uganda Army Air Force. In December 1975, Maruru was relieved of his duties as Air Force Commander.

He was dismissed from the Uganda Army in 1975. He went into exile, first to Nairobi, Kenya, then Dar es Salaam, Tanzania. At some point, he became a member of the militant anti-Amin opposition. Maruru joined the Save Uganda Movement (SUM) which intended to overthrow the Ugandan President through guerrilla attacks, helping to set up the group's command center in Tanzania. When the Uganda–Tanzania War broke out in 1979, Maruru was one of the exiles who organised a pro-Tanzanian militia of Ugandan rebels. As a SUM member, he attended the Moshi Conference which resulted in the merger of several anti-Amin groups into the Uganda National Liberation Front (UNLF) and its armed wing, the Uganda National Liberation Army (UNLA). Maruru was appointed secretary of the UNLA's Military Commission during the conference. At some point during the Uganda–Tanzania War, he became one of the top commanders of the Kikosi Maalum, a contingent of Ugandan rebel troops commanded by Tito Okello and Oyite Ojok.

Rise to army chief of staff and later military service 
In 1979 during the UNLF government, Maruru became a member of the National Consultative Council, which was the country's national legislative body at that time. After the fall of President Godfrey Binaisa in 1980, the UNLA appointed Maruru to the Military Commission to run the affairs of the country.

General elections were held in Uganda in 1980 and Maruru was appointed Brigade Commander in Northern Uganda based at Gulu. He was later transferred to command the Brigade in Western Uganda. He was appointed as Chief of Operations and Training in the UNLA.

When Tito Okello and Bazilio Olara Okello overthrew Obote in 1985, Maruru was promoted to the rank of brigadier and shortly after to major general. He was then appointed UNLA Chief of Staff. When the National Resistance Army (NRA) rebels overran Kampala in January 1986, Maruru was among the high-ranking officers who surrendered there. He personally met NRA leader Yoweri Museveni at Kampala's Republic House, telling him that he was content to be treated as prisoner of war or be released. To his surprise, Museveni offered him a job in the NRA. Maruru accepted, and went on to serve in Uganda's new national army.

Later life 
In 1990, Maruru was appointed as General Manager of Uganda Air Cargo. Maruru retired in 2002. In his later life he suffered from hypertension. He died on 11 January 2014 at Mulago Hospital in Kampala.

Personal life 
According to his brother Ham Tumuhairwe, Maruru was not very religious and "never liked going to church".

See also
 Uganda People's Defense Force
 Ntungamo District

Notes

References

Works cited

External links
Comment: UPDF Promotions Were Overdue As of 18 February 2019.

1942 births
2014 deaths
Ugandan aviators
University of Nairobi alumni
Ugandan military personnel
People from Ntungamo District
People from Western Region, Uganda
Ugandan generals
People educated at Mbarara High School
Military personnel of the Uganda–Tanzania War
Save Uganda Movement